Sarah Jane Caruana (born 4 August 1984) is a Maltese former footballer who played as a forward. She has been a member of the Malta women's national team.

See also
List of Malta women's international footballers

References

1984 births
Living people
Women's association football forwards
Maltese women's footballers
Malta women's international footballers
Hibernians F.C. players